Exley may refer to:

People
 Christopher Exley, British chemist
 Elizabeth Exley (1927–2007), Australian entomologist
 Frederick Exley (1929–1992), American writer
 Peter Exley (born 1964), British architect working in the United States
 Sharon Exley, designer, architectural partner of Peter
 Sheck Exley (1949–1994), American cave diver
 Thea Exley (1923–2007), Australian archivist and art historian
 Thomas Exley (1775–1855), English mathematician
 Zack Exley (born 1969), political and technology consultant

Fictional characters 

Edmund Exley, a character James Ellroy's novel L.A. Confidential
 Josh Exley, an alien baseball player in the 1999 X-Files episode The Unnatural

Companies
 Edward Exley Limited

See also
 Oechsle (disambiguation)